Chauncey T. Maggiacomo Jr. (born November 30, 1947) known as "Jocko" or, in high school, as "Chant," is a racing car driver from Poughkeepsie, New York. He is infamous for T-boning Bobby Allison, all but ending both careers.

His father Chauncey T. Maggiacomo (also nicknamed Jocko) was a famous modified stock car racer in the northeast. Jocko Sr. won 31 feature races and multiple championships at Riverside Park Speedway in Agawam, Mass., and won the track's biggest event, the Riverside 500. He is eighth on the track's all-time win list. He is a member of the New England Auto Racers Hall of Fame.

Jocko Jr., followed a different path, racing sportscars with the SCCA. He rose to the professional ranks, winning the 1976 SCCA Trans Am Series championship driving an ex-Roger Penske/Mark Donohue AMC Javelin.

Moving to NASCAR, Maggiacomo started 23 Winston Cup races in 10 seasons, primarily in the Northeastern United States.

Unable to avoid a spinning Bobby Allison in the 1988 Miller High Life 500 at Pocono, the T-bone crash with Maggiacomo ended Allison's driving career. According to Maggiacomo's autobiography, he chose to end his career too out of post-traumatic stress disorder and guilt of hitting Allison.

Motorsports career results

NASCAR
(key) (Bold – Pole position awarded by qualifying time. Italics – Pole position earned by points standings or practice time. * – Most laps led.)

Winston Cup Series

Daytona 500

ARCA Permatex SuperCar Series
(key) (Bold – Pole position awarded by qualifying time. Italics – Pole position earned by points standings or practice time. * – Most laps led.)

References

External links
 

1947 births
Living people
NASCAR drivers
Trans-Am Series drivers
Sportspeople from Poughkeepsie, New York
Racing drivers from New York (state)
ARCA Menards Series drivers
American people of Italian descent